Khunjerab National Park is a national park in Gilgit Baltistan, Pakistan. Khunjerab National Park is Pakistan's third largest national park, and is adjacent to the Taxkorgan Natural Reserve in China.

Etymology
Khun means "blood" and jerav means "to stream" in Wakhi, the native language of the region.

History
Khunjerab National Park was established primarily as a means to protect the Marco Polo sheep (as well as snow leopards and bharal) living in the area. The borders of the park were mapped by Schaller in 1974, after a short field survey. The park was formally established on 29 April 1975 by Prime Minister of Pakistan Zulfikar Ali Bhutto, who said that "it must become a world famous park".
 Despite being listed as a category 2 national park, banning human activities including agriculture and hunting, the park was poorly managed, meaning that illegal hunting of the Marco Polo sheep continued. Because of this, the International Union for Conservation of Nature commissioned Norwegian biologist Per Wegge to do a wildlife survey of the park in 1988. Wegge found that there was no evidence of competition between the domestic sheep being illegally grazed and the wild Marco Polo sheep, and that most of the illegal hunting was not being done by local Wakhi residents. He therefore proposed that the park be reclassified, allowing grazing and commercial hunting, with the profits going to local residents. However, the government overlooked Wegge's suggestions, instead drawing up a new management plan, which both the IUCN and the World Wildlife Fund supported as a means to preserve the park and protect the wildlife. Wegge was critical of the government scheme, claiming that it was based on financial considerations, with the Pakistani government hoping to attract tourists to the area. The IUCN agreed with this, and has since distanced itself from the national park. To help protect the animals from poaching, the WWF has created the Khunzerav Village Organization, which relies on people living in the area to report poaching or endangered animal sightings. This park was created on 29 April 1975 on the recommendation of wildlife biologist Dr. George Schaller. Over half of the park is above 4,000 m. Khunjerab Pass, the gateway to China via the Karakoram Highway, is at 4,934 m.

Wildlife
The primary purpose of this park was to provide protection to the endangered Marco Polo sheep, which is only found in this area in Pakistan. According to the Mir of Hunza, the population of sheep was around 400 but had dropped to below 180 by the time of the completion of the Karakoram Highway. A herd of almost 75 Marco Polo sheep was recorded in the spring of 1984 and park staff saw at least 50 crossing the pass in May 1989.

The park is also famous for its snow leopards. Some reports say that it might contain the highest density of these beautiful cats in the total Himalayan ecosystem, which is the natural habitat of these cats. Over 2,000 Siberian ibex, widely distributed and abundant in the park but absent from neighbouring China, are also present here.

Feral or semi-feral animals especially domestic yaks can be seen roaming in the park.

Mammals
Total species: 16. Mammals in the park include:

Birds

See also
Khunjerab Pass
Northern Pakistan

References

External links

WWFPak.org - Khunjerab
Objects of Desire in the Northern Areas - Report by John Mock, UC Berkeley
Mountain Protected Areas in Pakistan - Report by John Mock, UC Berkeley

National parks of Pakistan
Protected areas of Gilgit-Baltistan
Hunza District